Cispia is a genus of tussock moths in the family Erebidae. It was described by Francis Walker in 1855. They are found in India, Bhutan, Sri Lanka, China and southeast Asia (Thailand, Laos, Vietnam).

Description
Palpi porrect (projecting forward) where the second joint is long and hairy and third joint minute. Some have minute palpi though. Antennae bipectinate (comb like on both sides) in both sexes with long branches. Forewings with vein 3 to 5 from close to angle of cell. Vein 6 from upper angle. Veins 7 to 10 are stalked, where vein 10 being given off from nearer the cell or from the same point as vein 7. Hindwings with vein 3 from before angle and vein 5 from above it.

Species
The following species are included in the genus:
Cispia alba Moore, 1879
Cispia charma Swinhoe, 1899
Cispia cretacea Zhao, 1984
Cispia dipyrena Collenette, 1947
Cispia fasciata Semper, 1899
Cispia grisea Semper, 1899
Cispia griseola Zhao, 1987
Cispia joiceyi Collenette, 1930
Cispia lunata Zhao, 1984
Cispia ochrophaea Collenette, 1932
Cispia polygramma Collenette, 1951
Cispia punctifascia Walker, 1855
Cispia venosa Walker, 1862

References

Lymantriini
Moth genera